The Norway women's national tennis team represents Norway in Billie Jean King Cup tennis competition and are governed by the Norges Tennisforbund.  They compete in the Europe/Africa Zone of Group I.

History
Norway competed in its first Fed Cup in 1963.  Their best result was reaching the round of 16 in 1972 and 1974.

Current team (2022)
Ulrikke Eikeri
Malene Helgø
Melanie Stokke
Lilly Elida Haseth

See also
Billie Jean King Cup
Norway Davis Cup team

References

External links

Billie Jean King Cup teams
Fed Cup
Fed Cup